A sewing machine is a machine used to stitch fabric and other materials together with thread. Sewing machines were invented during the first Industrial Revolution to decrease the amount of manual sewing work performed in clothing companies.

The main household manufacturers are Baby Lock, Bernina (bernette), Brother, Janome (Elna), Juki, SVP Worldwide (Singer, Husqvarna Viking, Pfaff) and Aisin Seiki, a Toyota Group company.

Active sewing machine brands and companies

Baby Lock – a Tacony brand.
Bernina – privately owned international manufacturer of sewing, sergers, and embroidery systems. The company was founded in 1893 in Steckborn, Switzerland, by a Swiss inventor Fritz Gegauf.
bernette  – a brand of the BERNINA Textile Group.
Brother – Sewing machines company in Japan. In 1908, Established Yasui Sewing Machine Co. for sewing machine repair service, the predecessor to BROTHER INDUSTRIES, LTD., in Nagoya. The first product marketed under the Brother brand was launched in 1928, Designed for making straw hats. Succeeded in mass-production of home sewing machines in 1932. Launched S-7300A NEXIO the world's first electronic feeding system in 2015. Brother Industries also develops and sells garment printers (printers used for garment and fabric printing).
Feiyue Group - Chinese company.
Janome
Elna – Swiss sewing machine manufacturer. Elna began operations in the 1940s. In the late 1940s and 1950s, an increased demand for sewing machines in the United States transpired, and Elna machines were imported into the U.S., as well as other sewing machines from companies in Germany, Italy, Switzerland and Sweden.
Juki
Merrow Sewing Machine Company
, Italian sewing machine manufacturer
PFAFF Industrial
Sailrite, American manufacturer of industrial sewing machines for canvas and leather work.  Two models, the Fabricator, and the Ultrafeed LS and LSZ-1.
SVP Worldwide (Singer Viking PFAFF) – global company with these brands:
Singer Corporation – American manufacturer of sewing machines, first established as I. M. Singer & Co. in 1851 by Isaac Merritt Singer with New York lawyer Edward Clark.
VSM Group – (Viking Sewing Machines), formerly named Husqvarna Sewing Machines
PFAFF Household
Toyota Home Sewing – Aisin Seiki
Union Special – American industrial sewing machine company based in Huntley, Illinois
DUMMA INDUSTRIAL SEWING MACHINE

Defunct sewing machine brands and companies
American Sewing Machine Company
Davis Sewing Machine Company
Domestic Sewing Machine Company, later purchased by White Sewing Machine Company 
Jennie June – manufactured by the June Manufacturing Company, which was founded in 1879.
Jones Sewing Machine Company
Kimball and Morton of Glasgow – former manufacturer of domestic and industrial sewing machines based in Glasgow, Scotland, that was active between 1867 and 1955.
Leader Sewing Machine
National Sewing Machine Company – former Belvidere, Illinois-based manufacturer founded in the late 19th century, it manufactured sewing machines and other products.
New Home, purchased by Janome in 1960 and used as a badge for their own machines
Sewmor
Taft-Peirce Manufacturing Company
Tikkakoski
White Sewing Machine Company

See also

 Glossary of sewing terms
 Lists of brands
 List of sewing stitches
 Barthélemy Thimonnier – a French inventor who is attributed with the invention of the first sewing machine that replicated sewing by hand
 Textile machinery manufacturers
 Textile machinery manufacturers in German-language-wiki/textil-maschinen-bau-unter-nehmen
 digital-textile-printing

References

 
Sewing machine